Nikolaus Reinprecht (born 25 July 1942) is an Austrian sports shooter. He competed at the 1976 Summer Olympics and the 1980 Summer Olympics.

References

1942 births
Living people
Austrian male sport shooters
Olympic shooters of Austria
Shooters at the 1976 Summer Olympics
Shooters at the 1980 Summer Olympics
People from Eisenstadt
Sportspeople from Burgenland
20th-century Austrian people